Thomas McLaughlin (1878 or 1879 – April 1944) was an Irish nationalist politician.

Born in Armagh, he became politically active and rose to become the chair of Armagh Urban Council and a member of Armagh County Council.  He also served as Supreme Knight of the Knights of Saint Columbanus.  In 1928, he was the founding chairman of the National League of the North in Armagh.  In 1933, he was elected to represent the Nationalist Party in the Senate of Northern Ireland, and served until his death.

References

1870s births
1944 deaths
Members of Armagh County Council
Members of the Senate of Northern Ireland 1933–1937
Members of the Senate of Northern Ireland 1937–1941
Members of the Senate of Northern Ireland 1941–1945
Nationalist Party (Ireland) members of the Senate of Northern Ireland